CD Matchedje de Maputo, or simply Matchedje, is a Mozambique football club from Maputo which currently plays in the Mozambique Second Division.

In 1987 the team has won the Moçambola.

Stadium
The club plays their home matches at the Estádio da Machava, which has a maximum capacity of 35,000 people.

Achievements
 Moçambola
Winners (2): 1987, 1990

Performance in African competitions
CAF Champions League: 1 appearance
1988 African Cup of Champions Clubs -

References

External links

:fr:Matchedje de Maputo

Football clubs in Mozambique
Sport in Maputo